The cash, also called the sapek or sapeque, is a cast round coin with a square hole that was an official currency of Vietnam from the Đinh dynasty in 970 until the Nguyễn dynasty in 1945, and remained in circulation in North Vietnam until 1948. The same type of currency circulated in China, Japan, Korea, and Ryūkyū for centuries. Though the majority of Vietnamese cash coins throughout history were copper coins, lead, iron (from 1528) and zinc (from 1740) coins also circulated alongside them often at fluctuating rates (with 1 copper cash being worth 10 zinc cash in 1882). Coins made from metals of lower intrinsic value were introduced because of various superstitions involving Vietnamese people burying cash coins, as the problem of people burying cash coins became too much for the government. Almost all coins issued by government mints tended to be buried mere months after they had entered circulation. The Vietnamese government began issuing coins made from an alloy of zinc, lead, and tin. As these cash coins tended to be very fragile, they would decompose faster if buried, which caused the Vietnamese people to stop burying their coins.

Etymology

The French term for cash coins, comes from the Malay terms  or  meaning 'one pe(k)' (or pie, being a kind of currency), which in turn come from the Chinese word / meaning 'one-hundred'. The origin of the term might have come from the fact that cash coins were typically strung together in strings of around a hundred pieces.

The French adopted the term  in Macau and initially used it to refer to Chinese cash coins but later also applied the term for Vietnamese cash coins.

Slang names 

Currency units 

Traditionally, the basic units of Vietnamese currency were quan, tiền, and đồng. One  was 10 , and one  was between 50 and 100 , depending on the time period. From the reign of Emperor Trần Thái Tông onward, 1  was 69  in ordinary commercial transactions but 1  was 70  for official transactions. From the reign of Emperor Lê Lợi, 1  was decreed to be 50 . One  was equivalent to 600 , while 1  was only 360 . During the Later Lê dynasty, 1  was 60 ; therefore, 600  was 1 . During the Yuan dynasty, Vietnamese traders at the border with China used the rate 1  to 67 . Zinc coins began to appear in Dai Viet during the 18th century. One copper coin was worth 3 zinc coins. Beginning with the reign of Emperor Gia Long, both copper and zinc coins were in use. Originally the two coins had equal value, but eventually a copper coin rose to double the worth of a zinc coin, then triple, then sixfold, until the reign of Emperor Thành Thái, it was worth ten times a zinc coin.

History

Đinh and Early Lê dynasties 

The first Vietnamese coins were cast under the rule of the Đinh dynasty (968–981) with the introduction of the Thái Bình Hưng Bảo under Đinh Bộ Lĩnh. However, for the next two centuries coins would remain a rarity in the daily lives of the common people, as bartering would remain the dominant means of exchange under both the Đinh and Early Lê dynasties.

Lý dynasty 

All known variants of this cash coin feature the Chinese character  on the top of their reverse sides.

Generally cast coins produced by the Vietnamese from the reign of Lý Thái Tông and onwards were of diminutive quality compared to the Chinese variants. They were often produced with inferior metallic compositions and made to be thinner and lighter than the Chinese  due to a severe lack of copper that existed during the Lý dynasty. This inspired Chinese traders to recast Chinese coins for export to Vietnam, which caused an abundance of coinage to circulate in the country, prompting the Lý government to suspend the mintage of coins for five decades.

Trần dynasty 

The production of inferior coinage continued under the Trần dynasty. The production of both government and private cash coins happened at a large scale during the Trần period.

It was under the reign of Trần Dụ Tông that the most cash coins were cast of this period; this was because of several calamities such as failed crops that plagued the country during his reign, which caused the Trần government to issue more coins to the populace as compensation. The internal political struggles of the Trần dynasty ensured the cessation of the production of coinage, and as such, no coins were produced during the entire reigns of the last seven monarchs of the Trần dynasty.

Hồ dynasty 

During the Hồ dynasty the usage of coins was banned by Hồ Quý Ly in 1396 in favour of the  banknote series and ordered people to exchange their coinage for these banknotes (with an exchange rate of one  of copper coins for two  banknotes). Those who refused to exchange or continued to pay with coins would be executed and have their possessions taken by the government. Despite these harsh laws, very few people actually preferred paper money and coins remained widespread in circulation, forcing the Hồ dynasty to retract their policies. The  banknotes of the Hồ dynasty featured designs with auspicious clouds (one ), turtles (two ), Kỳ lân (three ), Phượng hoàng (five ), and dragons (one ).

Later Lê, Mạc, and Revival Lê dynasties 

After Lê Thái Tổ came to power in 1428 by ousting out the Ming dynasty ending the Fourth Chinese domination of Vietnam, Lê Thái Tổ enacted new policies to improve the quality of the manufacturing of coinage leading to the production of coins with both excellent craftsmanship and metal compositions that rivaled that of the best contemporary Chinese coinage.

The Mạc dynasty, which usurped power between the years 1528 to 1592, also minted its own coinage but they began to use zinc and iron, which were cheaper metals, and they further allowed private coinage to develop which decreased the quality of the coinage. After the Lê dynasty returned to power they tried to combat these monetary practices, but the shortage of copper (as the mines where the copper came from were mostly in areas controlled by China) and the division of the country between the two rival lordships (or principalities) of the Trịnh and Nguyễn lords made these measures ineffective.

Between 1633 and 1637 the Dutch East India Company sold 105,835 strings of 960 cash coins (or 101,600,640 ) to the Nguyễn lords in Vĩnh Lạc Thông Bảo, and Khoan Vĩnh Thông Bảo coins. This was because the Japanese had restricted trade, forcing the Southern Vietnamese traders to purchase their copper coins from the Dutch Republic rather than from Japanese merchants as before. This trade lead to a surplus of copper in the territory of the Nguyễn lords, allowing them to use the metal (which at the time was scarce in the north) for more practical applications such as nails and door hinges. After this, Nagasaki trade coins, which were specifically minted for the Vietnamese market, also started being traded and circulating in the northern parts of Vietnam where the smaller coins would often be melted down for utensils and only circulated in Hanoi, while larger Nagasaki trade coins circulated all over Vietnam.

From the Dương Hòa era (1635–1643) under Lê Thần Tông until 1675 no coins were cast due to the political turmoil. At the turn of the 18th century Lê Dụ Tông opened a number of copper mines and renewed the production of high quality coinage.

From 1719 the production of cast copper coins ceased for two decades and taxes were more heavily lifted on the Chinese population as Mandarins could receive a promotion in rank for every 600 strings of cash (or 600,000 coins).

Under Lê Hiển Tông a large variety of  coins were cast with varying descriptions on the obverse. In fact it is thought that more variations of the  coin exist than of any other Oriental cash coin in history. There were also new large  coins introduced with denominations of 50 and 100  and from 1740, various provincial mint marks were added on the reverses of coins. Currently there are around 80 known different kinds of  coins. This diversity exists because the Lê government was in dire need of coins to pay for its expenditures, while it needed to collect more taxes in coins, so it began to mint a lot of coins. Later to fulfill this need, the Lê legalised the previously detrimental workshops that were minting inferior coins in 1760 in order to meet the market's high demand for coinage; this backfired as the people found the huge variety in quality and quantity confusing.

In 1775, after capturing Thuận Hóa from the Nguyễn lords, Trịnh Sâm stipulated that 3 zinc cash coins from Nam Hà would be accepted for 1 zinc cash coin from Bắc Hà.

Tây Sơn dynasty 

Under Nguyễn Nhạc the description of  Phân was first added to the reverses of some coins indicating their weight; this continued under the Nguyễn dynasty. Under the reign of Nguyễn Huệ,  cash coins were produced made in two different types of metal, one series of copper and one series of tin, as well as alloys between the two or copper coins of red copper.

Nguyễn dynasty 

During the Nguyễn dynasty period in addition to their circulating zinc and copper-alloy cash coins the government also produced silver and gold cash coins.

Independent Nguyễn dynasty and French Cochinchina 

Under the Gia Long Emperor three kinds of cash coins were produced in smaller denominations made of copper, lead, and zinc. According to the book Đại Nam thực lục chính biên the first cash coins with the inscription Gia Long Thông Bảo (嘉隆通寶) were cast in the year Gia Long 2 (1802). Under the Gia Long Emperor mints were opened in Bắc Thành (Hanoi) and Gia Định (Hồ Chí Minh City).

The cash coins of the Tây Sơn dynasty were initially only allowed to circulate for 5 years after the ascension of Gia Long. According to a document from the year Gia Long 16 (1817) the government of the Nguyễn dynasty ordered for the destruction of all "fake cash coins" from circulation explaining that the prior currency situation was chaotic. The "fake cash coins" were still allowed to circulate in the year Gia Long 15 and must now be destroyed. All payments and salaries for public services and government employees must be expressed in zinc cash coins, government employees must collect all "fake cash coins" they have and store it in a government warehouse to later be melted down and exchanged for the newly minted zinc cash coins. The zinc cash coins were also ordered to circulate in the Southern regions and merchants were ordered to carry them with them whenever they would engage in trade to promote their circulation.

Throughout most of the Nguyễn dynasty period, the government tried to exclude money it termed Tiền cấm (錢禁, "Forbidden money") from circulation. The Tiền cấm included the following three categories:

 1: Tây Sơn dynasty coinage, because of the Nguyễn dynasty's dislike of the Tây Sơn dynasty, which it viewed as illegitimate, it tried to exclude its coinage from circulation. But because of the extensive issuance of cash coins during this period it wasn't until 1822 that the Nguyễn could successfully discourage their circulation by fixing an exchange rate of 2 Tây Sơn dynasty copper-alloy cash coins for 1 Nguyễn dynasty zinc cash coin.
 2: Black money, including stolen money.
 3: Inferior quality money created by Chinese merchants, these cash coins were often of inferior quality and contained a high percentage of lead.

According to the Đại Nam Thực lục chính biên, there were several different types of Gia Long Thông Bảo cash coins cast. A bronze cash coin with the inscription Thất phần (七分) in seal script on its reverse, a thicker zinc cash coin with the inscription Nhất phần on its reverse, and a copper-alloy cash coin with dots on its reverse side symbolising the sun and moon. The 7 phần zinc cash coins started being made from the year Gia Long 12 (1813) onwards.

Since the reign of the Gia Long Emperor, zinc cash coins had replaced the usage of copper and brass cash coins and formed the basis of the Vietnamese currency system. Under Gia Long the standard 1 văn denomination coins weighed seven  and under the Minh Mạng Emperor six  (approximately 2.28 grams) which would remain the standard for future rulers. Zinc cash coins produced in Hanoi under the Tự Đức Emperor had the mint mark  on them, with there being another mint in Sơn Tây.

From the Gia Long until the Thiệu Trị periods 1 copper-alloy cash coin was valued at 1.2 to 1.3 zinc cash coins, from the Tự Đức onwards they were valued at 1.3 to 1.4 zinc cash coins each.

From 1837 during the first year of the reign of the Minh Mạng Emperor, Mạch brass cash coins were issued; these cash coins feature Minh Mạng Thông Bảo on their obverses but have eight characters on their reverses. One  coins would be continued under subsequent rulers of the Nguyễn dynasty.

In 1849 the Tự Đức Emperor was forced to legalise the private production of zinc cash coins as too many illegal mints kept being established throughout both Đại Nam and China. These privately minted zinc cash coins were allowed as long as they circulated according to their correct weights.

However, in 1871 the production of zinc cash coins stopped as many mines were being blocked by Chinese pirates and the continued production of these coins would be too expensive. Other reasons for the discontinuation of zinc cash coins despite them being indispensable to the general populace were because they were heavy compared to their nominal value and the metal was quite brittle. Following the establishment of the French colony of Cochinchina the chaotic monetary situation of Đại Nam severely worsened as Qing Chinese merchants quickly took advantage of it and started producing poor quality cash coins to bring to the colony where no regulations against their activities existed. The Tự Đức Emperor tried to search Qing merchant ships, make outposts block their entry, and ban Qing Chinese merchants from bringing in too much money. Though by 1879 the Nguyễn court was forced to accept the copper-alloy Hành dị dạng tiền (deformed money) at a value of 3 zinc cash coins, provided that the cash coin in question was quite similar in quality to the indigenous Vietnamese currency.

To the French, zinc coinage also presented a huge inconvenience since the colonisation of Cochinchina in 1859 as the exchange between French francs and zinc  meant that a large number of zinc coins were exchanged for the French franc. Zinc cash coins often broke during transportation as the strings that kept them together would often snap. The coins would fall on the ground and a great number of them would break into pieces; these coins were also less resistant to oxidation, causing them to corrode faster than other coinages.

Prior to 1849 brass coins had become an extreme rarity and only circulated in the provinces surrounding the capital cities of Vietnam, but under Tự Đức new regulations and (uniform) standards for copper cash coins were created to help promote their usage. Between 1868 and 1872 brass coins were only around 50% copper, and 50% zinc. Due to the natural scarcity of copper in Vietnam the country always lacked the resources to produce sufficient copper coinage for circulation.

Under Tự Đức large coins with the denomination of 60  were introduced. In 1870 Tự Đức Bảo Sao cash coins of 2, 3, 8, and 9  were issued. Large denomination coins were mostly used for tax collection as their relatively low intrinsic value lowered their spending power on the market.

In 1882, at the time when Eduardo Toda y Güell's Annam and its minor currency was published, only two government mints remained in operation: one in Hanoi, and one in Huế. However, private mints were allowed to cast cash coins with the permission of the government, and a large number of cash coins were also imported from abroad as at that time the Portuguese colony of Macau had six mints with twelve furnaces producing 600,000 cash coins for Vietnam on a daily basis.

Cash coins circulated in the 19th century along with silver and gold bars, as well as silver and gold coins weighed in tiền. Denominations up to ten  were minted, with the seven  coins in gold and silver being similar in size and weight to the Spanish eight real and eight escudo pieces. These coins continued to be minted into the 20th century, albeit increasingly supplanted by French colonial coinage.

After the introduction of modern coinage by the French in 1878, cash coins remained in general circulation in French Cochinchina.

Initially the French attempted to supplement cash coins in circulation by punching round holes into French 1 centime coins and shipping a large amount of them to French Cochinchina, but these coins did not see much circulation and the Cochinchinese people largely rejected them.

All coins except for the piastre were allowed to be issued, which allowed for Spanish dollars and Mexican reals to continue circulating. The Paris Mint produced the new machine-struck 2   cash coins. These French-produced bronze cash coins weighed 2 grams and were valued at  piastre. They saw considerably more circulation than the previous French attempt at creating cash coins, but were still largely disliked by the Cochinchinese people. The local population still preferred their own  cash coins despite only being valued at  piastre.

Under French rule 

In the year 1883 the Harmand Treaty was signed, which was replaced in 1884 with the Patenôtre Treaty. These treaties were created following the French conquest of Đại Nam, which established the French protectorates of Annam and Tonkin. While these two countries were in a subordinate relationship with France, they were still nominally ruled by the Nguyễn Empire and the old currency system continued to be used and produced by the government of the Nguyễn dynasty there. Despite the later introduction of the French Indochinese piastre, zinc and copper-alloy cash coins would continue to circulate among the Vietnamese populace throughout the country as the primary form of coinage, as the majority of the population lived in extreme poverty until 1945 (and 1948 in some areas). They were valued at the rates of about 500–600 cash coins for one piastre. The need for coins was only a minor part in the lives of most Vietnamese people at the time, as bartering remained more common since all coins were bartered on the market according to their current intrinsic values.

During the Kiến Phúc period (2 December 1883 – 31 July 1884), the regent Nguyễn Văn Tường accepted bribes from Qing Chinese merchants to allow them to bring their tiền sềnh (錢浧, "extraordinary money") depicting the reign era of the Tự Đức Emperor into the country. Nguyễn Văn Tường forced people to accept and spend this bad quality Chinese imitation money, those who refused to accept it could face the penalty of arrest. This money is described as being "very ugly, too thin, and extremely light" (weighing only about 1 gram), according to descriptions it was so light in fact that these cash coins can float on water. Roman Catholic missionaries active in Đại Nam took advantage of bad condition of this new money to propagate the idea that it was a sign that the Nguyễn dynasty was in decline. These cash coins have sometimes been mistaken for the 17th and 18th century Tiền gián (with the inscriptions of Thiên Thánh Nguyên Bảo and An Pháp Nguyên Bảo). However, these earlier low quality money was still heavier and more valuable than the nearly worthless tiền sềnh brought into the country by merchants from the Qing dynasty by the end of the 19th century.

Following the establishment of French Indochina, a new version of the French 2  was produced from 1887 to 1902, which was also valued at  piastre and was likely forced on the Vietnamese when they were paid for their goods and services by the French, as the preference still was for indigenous cash coins.

Each of these cash coins had their own value against the French Indochinese piastre. Because the exchange values between the native cash coins and silver piastres were confusing, the local Vietnamese people were often cheated by the money changers during this period.

The  was mixed with iron when it was minted and featured blank reverse sides. Several batches of  cash coins were produced, but due to the fact that the French Army was putting pressure on the Huế Court the throne changed hands several times and the rule of the  Emperor was very brief, so not much attention to the economy was paid by government. Because of these factors only a very small number of  cash coins were minted which confirm the new Emperor's reign era name, but they didn't have a large effect on the money in circulation as their quantity was too small to make a difference. The  cash coins were likewise only minted in small quantities due to his short reign. These cash coins were made from copper-alloys and have the inscription "Lục Văn" (六文) on their reverse indicating their denomination.

During the reign of the Đồng Khánh Emperor two series of  cash coins were minted; the first series were cast in 1776 with a diameter of 26 millimeters, and the second series in 1887 with a diameter of 23 millimeters. All cash coins from this era had blank reverse sides.

In 1894 the Note sur la circulation monétaire et les moyens d'échange dans les colonies françaises et pays de protectorat, d'après les documents officiels recueillis par l'administration des colonies reported that aside from the piastre and zinc and copper-alloy cash coins other indigenous currencies circulated in the Nguyễn dynasty, these included a silver cash coin which was valued at 2 strings each, a silver sycee weighing 1 Lượng was valued at 12 strings, a silver Nen was valued at 140 strings, a gold Lượng valued at 300 strings, and a gold Nen valued at 3000 strings. It was reported that Asian merchants used conventional silver bars made from melted coins that were withdrawn from circulation, these were valued at 15 piastres. In Tonkin zinc cash coins remained in circulation while they only continued to circulate in some regions of Annam.

In 1894 a string of cash coins in Tonkin was composed of 600 zinc cash coins divided into rows of 10 coins each (called a tiền), while in Annam a string was composed of 100 copper-alloy cash coins divided into rows of 10. At the time 8~10 strings of cash coins were worth a piastre. In the French protectorate of Cambodia a string would contain 450 to 500 Vietnamese cash coins, with 8 cash coins being valued at 1 cent.

On 1 August 1898 it was reported in the  that the Huế Mint was closed in 1887, and in 1894 the casting of cash coins had started at the Thanh Hóa Mint. Between the years 1889 and 1890 the Huế Mint produced 1321 strings of 600 small brass  cash coins. These small brass cash coins were valued at six zinc cash coins. In the year 1893, large brass  cash coins with a denomination of ten văn, or ten zinc cash coins, started being produced by the Huế Mint. The production of  cash coins were resumed at the Thanh Hóa Mint between the years 1894 and 1899. Under Emperor Thành Thái gold and silver coinages were also produced.

In the year 1902 the French ceased production of machine-struck cash coins at the Paris Mint and completely deferred the production of cash coins back to the government of the Nguyễn dynasty. There were people in Hanoi and Saigon that still preferred the French machine-struck cash coins, so a committee was set up in Hanoi that created a machine-struck zinc cash coin valued at  piastre dated 1905 but issued in 1906. However, this series of cash coins was not well received by either the local or the French population as the coins were brittle, prone to corrosion, and easily broken, so their production was quickly halted.

In order to try to standardise the exchange rate between the French Indochinese piastre and cash coins, the Resident-Superior of the French protectorate of Tonkin fixed the local Tonkinese exchange rates every month. This was done to prevent rampant speculation by Chinese merchants and Nguyễn dynasty mandarins. Money changers generally tended to value the piastre based on its weight in silver, but also according to the perfection of its strike, and even according to the purity of its silver. The official exchange rates were not rigorously applied and the money changers often estimated their own values to individual piastre coins.

In 1932 it was reported by L'Éveil économique de l'Indochine ("The Economic Awakening of Indochina") that cash coins were increasingly becoming scarce in Annam and Tonkin, the L'Éveil économique de l'Indochine advised the government of the Nguyễn dynasty to start producing zinc Bảo Đại Thông Bảo cash coins to counter the scarcity of low denomination currencies, at this time zinc cash coins were still circulating in Annam while very few of them were left in Tonkin.

On 29 September 1939 the Hanoian newspaper l'Effort Indochinois reported that the governments of French Indochina and the Nguyễn dynasty pursued a policy called an muoi, which sought to stabilise the exchange rate between cash coins and the piastre at 360:1. During this period there was a market liquidity crisis worsened by the hoarding of low denomination cash coins by the general populace causing massive deflation of cash coins. There has been a serious devaluation of the piastre in Annam, among the solutions proposed by the government of French Indochina was the increased production of paper money. Despite starting the an muoi policy in 1937, by 1939 the exchange rate between the piastre and cash coins was at 5 strings per piastre while in some rural areas the price of the piastre went down as much as 3 strings per piastre.

The deflation of cash coins proved to be very detrimental to the economy and local trade. The reason why these exchange rates were unstable was because cash coins remained independent of the piastre, despite their fixed exchange rates. l'Effort Indochinois reported that in Tonkin the Khải Định Thông Bảo and Bảo Đại Thông Bảo cash coins were less sensitive to the deflationary pressure caused by hoarding than older cash coins as they weren't being overvalued in the market in relation to the French Indochinese piastre. As Tonkinese people had a much higher standard of living than the Annamites, the velocity of money was likewise faster and coins like the 10 cents, 20 cents, Etc. mingled more with the cash coins in Tonkin than they did in Annam.

l'Effort Indochinois noted that many causes of the deflation and hoarding were more psychological in nature rather than practical, noting that the new cash coins that were being produced in Tonkin was manufactured in a different way from the old ones (machine-struck vs. cast) and that this development was even more recent than banknotes. Meanwhile, in Annam large quantities of Minh Mạng Thông Bảo, Thiệu Trị Thông Bảo, Etc. as well as millennium old cash coins remained in circulation as the population stubbornly held onto them. In fact, there remained a strong preference for cast Bảo Đại Thông Bảo cash coins over machine-struck ones of the same inscription. This was as the population preferred to keep with the traditional currency system and that cast cash coins were seen as "good old sapèques" from "the good old days" as opposed to both machine-struck cash coins and the French Indochinese piastre who saw it as "modern inventions incompatible with their traditional lifestyles". To combat this mentality l'Effort Indochinois advised the government to mint cash coins of different models and metals and to give them a clearly defined value in relation to the divisionaries of the piastre and introduce them to the Annamese countryside, as well as to introduce the machine-struck Bảo Đại Thông Bảo that were already circulating in Tonkin into rural Annam.

The last monarch whose name was cast on cash coins, Emperor Bảo Đại, died in 1997.

Democratic Republic of Vietnam 

The Democratic Republic of Viet Nam Decree 51/SL of 6 January 1947 officially set the exchange rate at twenty Vietnamese cash coins for one North Vietnamese  making them equal to five  each. Vietnamese cash coins continued to officially circulate in the Democratic Republic of Vietnam until 13 April 1948.

Aftermath 

During the Vietnam War a large number of Vietnamese numismatic charms with both authentic as well as fantasy coin inscriptions were produced in South Vietnam to be sold to foreigners interested in collecting Vietnamese antiques.

List of Vietnamese cash coins

Official and semi-official cash coins 

During the almost 1000 years that Vietnamese copper cash coins were produced, they often significantly changed quality, alloy, size, and workmanship. In general, the coins bear the era name(s) of the monarch (Niên hiệu/) but may also be inscribed with mint marks, denominations, miscellaneous characters, and decorations.

Unlike Chinese, Korean, Japanese, and Ryūkyūan cash coins that always have the inscription in only one typeface, Vietnamese cash coins tend to be more idiosyncratic, bearing sometimes Regular script, Seal script, and even Running script on the same coins for different characters, and it is not uncommon for one coin to be cast almost entirely in one typeface but with an odd character in another. Though early Vietnamese coins often bore the calligraphic style of the Chinese Khai Nguyên Thông Bảo coin, especially those from the Đinh until the Trần dynasties.

The following coins were produced to circulate in Vietnam:

Unidentified Vietnamese coins from 1600 and later 

At various times many rebel leaders proclaimed themselves as lords, kings, and emperors, and had produced their own coinage with their reign names and titles on them, but as their rebellions would prove unsuccessful or brief, their reigns and titles would go unrecorded in Vietnamese history. Therefore, coins produced by their rebellions cannot easily be classified. Coins were also often privately cast and these coins were sometimes of high quality or well-made imitations of imperial coinage, though often they would bear the same inscriptions as already circulating coinage and sometimes they would have "newly invented" inscriptions. The Nguyễn lords that ruled over Southern Vietnam had also produced their own coinage at various times as they were the de facto kings of the South, but as their rule was unofficial, it is currently unknown which coins can be attributed to which Nguyễn lord. Since Edouard Toda made his list in 1882, several of the coins that he had described as "originating from the Quảng Nam province" have been ascribed to the Nguyễn lords that the numismatists of his time could not identify. During the rule of the Nguyễn lords, many foundries for private mintage were also opened and many of these coins bear the same inscriptions as government-cast coinage or even bear newly invented inscriptions, making it hard to attribute these coins.

The following list contains Vietnamese cash coins whose origins cannot be (currently) established:

Machine-struck cash coins made by the French government 

During the time that Vietnam was under French administration, the French started minting cash coins for circulation first for within the colony of Cochinchina and then for the other regions of Vietnam. These coins were minted in Paris and were all struck as opposed to the contemporary cast coinage that already circulated within Vietnam.

After the French had annexed Cochinchina from the Vietnamese, cash coins would continue to circulate in the region and depending on their weight and metal (as Vietnamese cash coins made from copper, tin, and zinc circulated simultaneously at the time at fluctuating rates) were accepted at six hundred to one thousand cash coins for a single Mexican or Spanish eight real coin or one piastre. In 1870 the North German company Dietrich Uhlhorn started privately minting machine-struck Tự Đức Thông Bảo (嗣德通寶) coins as the demand for cash coins in French Cochinchina was high. The coin weighed four grams which was close to the official weight of ten phần (3.7783 grams), which was the standard used by the imperial government at the time. Around 1875 the French introduced holed one-cent coins styled after the Vietnamese cash. In 1879 the French introduced the Cochinchinese Sapèque with a nominal value of  piastre, but the Vietnamese population at the time still preferred the old Tự Đức Thông Bảo coins despite their lower nominal value. The weight and size of the French Indochinese one-cent coin was reduced and the coin was holed in 1896 in order to appear more similar to cash coins. This was done to reflect the practice of stringing coins together and carrying them on a belt or pole because Oriental garments at the time did not have pockets. The French production of machine-struck cash coins was halted in 1902. As there were people in Hanoi and Saigon that did not want to give up on the production of machine-struck cash coins, a committee decided to strike zinc Sapèque coins with a nominal value of  piastre. These coins were produced at the Paris Mint and were dated 1905 despite being put into circulation only in 1906. These coins corroded and broke quite easily which made them unpopular and their production quickly ceased.

After Khải Định became Emperor in 1916, Hanoi reduced the funds to cast Vietnamese cash coins, which had a dissatisfying effect on the Vietnamese market as the demand for cash coins remained high, so another committee was formed in Hanoi that ordered the creation of machine-struck copper-alloy Khải Định Thông Bảo (啓定通寶) cash coins to be minted in Haiphong. These coins weighed more than the old French Sapèques and were around 2.50 grams and were accepted at  piastre. There were 27 million Khải Định Thông Bảo of the first variant produced, while the second variant of the machine-struck Khải Định Thông Bảo had a mintage of 200 million. This was likely continued after the ascension of Emperor Bảo Đại in 1926, which was normal as previous Vietnamese emperors also kept producing cash coins with the inscription of their predecessors for a period of time. Emperor Bảo Đại had ordered the creation of cast Bảo Đại Thông Bảo (保大通寶) cash coins again which weighed 3.2 gram in 1933, while the French simultaneously began minting machine-struck coins with the same inscription that weighed 1.36 grams and were probably valued at  piastre. There were two variants of this cash coin, where one had a large 大 (Đại) while the other had a smaller 大.

Commemorative cash coins

Vạn Thọ Thông Bảo 

During the 60th birthday of Revival Lê dynasty Emperor Lê Hiển Tông in 1774, a special Vạn Thọ Thông Bảo (萬夀通寶) amulet was cast; these charms were often used to commemorate the birthday of an emperor as had happened in the Qing dynasty with the 60th birthdays of Chinese emperors. The reason these charms are cast on this particular event is because sixty years symbolise a complete cycle of the ten heavenly stems and the twelve earthly branches.

Presentation coins and the Sapèque d'Honneur 

Special cash coins were also produced in the form of decorations given by the government of the Nguyễn dynasty until 1945. Like in Imperial China, these coins came in the form of presentation coins (known in Vietnamese as Tiền), but after French colonisation these special cash coin awards known as Tiền were later also awarded as European-style medals called the Sapèque d'Honneur ('Cash coin of Honour').

These presentation coin decorations came in multiple classes and were known as Đồng Tiền (銅錢, 'Copper money'), Ngân Tiền (銀錢, 'Silver money'), and Kim Tiền (金錢, 'Gold money'). The Sapèque d'Honneur medal was further subdivided into the Sapèque d'Argent (made of silver) and the Sapèque d'Or (made of gold).

These decorations generally took the shape of silver or gold cash coins as well as other coinages issued by the Nguyễn dynasty, but would often have more elaborate designs and (often) different inscriptions.

Recovery of cash coins in modern Vietnam 
 

In modern Vietnam the supply of undiscovered cash coins is rapidly declining as large amounts of Vietnamese cash coins were excavated during the 1980s and 1990s. In Vietnam the excavation of antiques such as cash coins is an industry in itself and cash coins are mostly dug up by farmers. After the Vietnam War ended in 1975, a large number of metal detectors numbering in the many thousands were left behind in the former area of South Vietnam, which helped fuel the rise of this industry. The antique bronze industry is mostly concentrated in small rural villages where farmers rent metal detectors to search their own lands for bronze antiques to then either sell as scrap or to dealers. These buyers purchase lumps of cash coins either by the kilogramme or ton and hire skilled people to search through these lumps of cash coins for sellable specimens. These coins are then sold to other dealers in Vietnam, China, and Japan. During the zenith of the coin recovery business in Vietnam, the number of bulk coins found on a monthly basis was fifteen tons. Only roughly fifteen kilogrammes of those coins were sellable and the rest of the coins would be melted down as scrap metal. As better metal detectors that could search deeper were introduced, more Vietnamese cash coins were discovered, but in modern times the supply of previously undiscovered Vietnamese cash coins is quickly diminishing.

In modern times many Vietnamese cash coins are found in sunken shipwrecks which are mandated by Vietnamese law to be the property of the Vietnamese government as salvaged ships of which the owner was unknown belong to the state.

Notable recent large finds of cash coins in Vietnam include 100 kilogrammes of Chinese cash coins and 35 kilogrammes of Vietnamese cash coins unearthed in the province of Quảng Trị in 2007, 52.9 kilogrammes of Chinese and Vietnamese cash coins unearthed in a cemetery in Haiphong in 2008, 50 kilogrammes of cash coins in the province of Hà Nam in 2015, and some Nagasaki trade coins in the province of Hà Tĩnh in 2018.

See also 

 Vietnamese dynasties
 Cash
 Chinese cash
 Japanese mon
 Korean mun
 Ryukyuan mon

Notes

References

Sources 

 ED. TODA. (1882) ANNAM and its minor currency. Hosted on Art-Hanoi. (Wikimedia Commons)
 Dr. R. Allan Barker. (2004) The historical Cash Coins of Viet Nam.  
 Howard A. Daniel, III - The Catalog and Guidebook of Southeast Asian Coins and Currency, Volume I, France (3rd Edition). Published: 10 April 2018. . 
 Pham Quoc Quan, Nguyen Dinh Chien, Nguyen Quoc Binh and Xiong Bao Kang: Tien Kim Loai Viet Nam. Vietnamese Coins. Bao Tang Lich Su Viet Nam. National Museum of Vietnamese History. Ha noi, 2005. (in Vietnamese)
 Hội khoa học lịch sử Thừa Thiên Huế, sách đã dẫn. (in Vietnamese)
 Trương Hữu Quýnh, Đinh Xuân Lâm, Lê Mậu Hãn, sách đã dẫn. (in Vietnamese)
 Lục Đức Thuận, Võ Quốc Ky (2009), Tiền cổ Việt Nam, Nhà xuất bản Giáo dục. (in Vietnamese)
 Đỗ Văn Ninh (1992), Tiền cổ Việt Nam, Nhà xuất bản Khoa học xã hội. (in Vietnamese)
 Trương Hữu Quýnh, Đinh Xuân Lâm, Lê Mậu Hãn chủ biên (2008), Đại cương lịch sử Việt Nam, Nhà xuất bản Giáo dục. (in Vietnamese)
 Viện Sử học (2007), Lịch sử Việt Nam, tập 4, Nhà xuất bản Khoa học xã hội. (in Vietnamese)
 Trần Trọng Kim (2010), Việt Nam sử lược, Nhà xuất bản Thời đại. (in Vietnamese)
 Catalogue des monnaies vietnamiennes (in French), François Thierry
 Yves Coativy, "Les monnaies vietnamiennes d'or et d'argent anépigraphes et à légendes (1820–1883)", Bulletin de la Société Française de Numismatique, février 2016, p. 57-62, (in French)
 Tien Kim Loai Viet Nam (Vietnamese Coins), Pham Quoc Quan, Hanoi, 2005. (in Vietnamese)
 W. Op den Velde, "Cash coin index. The Cash Coins of Vietnam", Amsterdam, 1996.

External links 

 Collection Banknotes of Vietnam and the World
 Coins and Banknotes of Vietnam and French Indochina
 Cash coins of Vietnam 968 - 1945. Online Identifier

 

Currencies of Vietnam
Ancient currencies
Medieval currencies
Modern obsolete currencies
Economic history of Vietnam
Cash coins